East Sydney may refer to:

 East Sydney, New South Wales
 Division of East Sydney
 Electoral district of East Sydney
 East Sydney Australian Football Club